Chris Jenkins (born 14 August 1988) is a Welsh professional boxer who held the British and Commonwealth welterweight titles between 2019 and 2021.

Amateur career 

Jenkins represented Wales at the 2011 World Amateur Boxing Championships in Baku, Azerbaijan. He also represented his country at the 2007 World Amateur Boxing Championships in Chicago
He also won a gold medal at the Canada Cup

He has also won three Welsh senior titles.

Professional career 

Chris Jenkins turned professional in 2012, signing with Neath based boxing manager/promoter Paul Boyce. He is currently being trained by Ronnie Morris and Jimmy Broomfield at the Cwmgors Boxing Club. His first professional fight took place at the Oceana Nightclub, Swansea, against Aberystwyth based fighter Russell Pearce. Chris won by a technical knockout in second round

The Prizefighter competition was broadcast live on Sky Sports from York Hall, Bethnal Green on 6 July 2013.
To win the competition Jenkins, fighting for the first time outside Wales as a professional, beat Tony Owen and Eren Arif both on points decisions in the early stages. He then defeated Southern Area champion Danny Conner in a-round-and-a-half to claim the Prizefighter trophy and a cheque for £34,000 (£32,000 for the win and an extra £2,000 for stopping his opponent).

On 7 September 2013 Jenkins fought the Frenchman Laurent Ferra on the Ricky Burns bill in Glasgow. The fight went the full distance with Chris winning on points (60–55 on the scorecard). Ferra proved to be a tough and durable opponent in a hard and competitive fight, however Jenkins outmatched his opponent in both skill and speed. Jenkins did suffered a cut above the left eye due to a head clash, but this was kept under control by cuts man Jimmy Broomfield and it did not seem to noticeably affect his performance.

On 1 February 2014, Chris, in what was only his thirteenth fight as a professional, won the WBC International belt at the Motorpoint Arena, Cardiff. He featured on the undercard of the Matchroom Sports 'Reloaded' show. Chris beat the former French Champion Christopher Serbire convincingly on points over ten rounds. This fight marked a step up for Chris as he had only boxed up to six rounds previously.

On the undercard of the 'Welsh Pride' show, which took place on 21 March 2014 at the Merthyr Leisure Centre, Chris dispatched of Bulgaria's Asan Yuseinov in just half a round. A stinging left to the body caused Yuseinov to collapse to the canvas and he couldn't beat the referee's count.

On 17 May 2014 at Cardiff's Motorpoint Arena, Chris defeated the cagey Nicaraguan fighter (based in Barcelona, Spain) Miguel Aguilar on points, over six rounds. Chris won every round convincingly. The fight featured on the Matchroom's 'The Second Coming' bill, which included the return to the ring of Nathan Cleverly and an official eliminator for the WBC featherweight title for Lee Selby.

Jacek Wylezol from Poland was his next opponent. The bout took place at the Rhydycar Leisure Centre in Merthyr Tydfil on 24 October 2014. Jenkins quickly dispatched of Wylezol in one round with a ferocious body shot.

After the original fight had to be reschedule from 23 January 2014 in Manchester (due to the cancellation of the main event, Anthony Crolla v Richar Abril), Jenkins is now due to fight the Scottish veteran Willie Limond for his British title. The fight will take place on 28 March 2015 in Sheffield. Chris Jenkins became British Champion of the welterweight division  on the 8 of March 2019 upsetting the odds and defeating Johnny Garton in the Royal Albert Hall.

Professional boxing record

External links 
 The boxing record of Chris Jenkins

References 

1988 births
Living people
Welsh male boxers
Light-welterweight boxers
British Boxing Board of Control champions
Commonwealth Boxing Council champions